The Experimental Theatre is a 300-seat theatre at the National Centre for the Performing Arts in Mumbai, India. It was inaugurated in April 1986 as a black box theatre venue with modular seating and staging units.

History

The NCPA was constructed in the 1980s. After the Tata Theatre was constructed, work began on the Experimental Theatre, a versatile black box theatre space which small-scale groups to perform flexible works at the centre. Tata Steel (formerly Tata Iron & Steel Company) made an initial donation to the Theatre of 5 million rupees. The Theatre was officially inaugurated on 25 April 1986.

Facilities

Besides the theatre itself, the Experimental Theatre includes three conference rooms, large foyer spaces and a museum.

According to the Larsen & Toubro the acoustics of this theatre allow individual instruments to be appreciated without amplification.

Performances

The Experimental Theatre has hosted experimental plays, Indian epics, classical music concerts, and Western operas and ballets. Famous artists such as Romain Descharmes have performed there.

See also

 NCPA
 Tata Theatre
 Jamshed Bhabha Theatre

References

Theatres in Mumbai
Theatres completed in 1986
Performing arts centres
1986 establishments in Maharashtra
20th-century architecture in India